Alvand Mirza was the Qara Qoyunlu ruler of Amid and Asadabad.

Early life 
Alvand Mirza was appointed to rule Mosul during his uncle Jahan Shah's reign. Mirza rebelled against the latter and was forced to flee to the Aq Qoyunlu, then under the rule of Jahangir Beg. Jahan Shah demanded that his rebellious nephew be handed over to him, but Jahangir Beg refused. Jahan Shah then invaded Erzincan and sent his grandnephew, Rustem Beg, to subdue Jahangir Beg. Hopelessly, Jahangir Beg sent his mother Sara Khatun to Mamluk Egypt, while Jahan Shah started to support his half-brother Sheikh Hasan. Sheikh Hasan was killed by Uzun Hasan, brother of Jahangir Beg; Jahan Shah quickly offered peace to Aq Qoyunlu, in return for accepting their submission. Jahangir Beg accepted and also wed his daughter to Jahan Shah' son Mirza Muhammad.

In Timurid service 
Upon the Aq Qoyunlu's submission, Alvand Mirza left for Shiraz with his son Pirguli in a bid to join the Timurid ruler Babur. He was made a commander in the Timurid army and joined Babur in a siege of Samarkand in 1454. He was sent by Babur to conquer Sistan and Kirman. After defeating Jahan Shah's generals Amir Bayazid and Shahsevar Beg, they were soon followed by his son Mirza Yusuf. Clashes stopped after Babur's death on 25 March 1457, followed by Jahan Shah's conquest of Khorasan

During reign of Jahan Shah 
After Jahan Shah's capture of Herat, Alvand resubmitted to his uncle in hopes of retaining Kirman. Jahan Shah however, only granted him Asadabad. Mirza Yusuf's daughter Khadija Begum was wed to Pirguli Beg. Alvand left Kirman to Jahan Shah's general Mansur Beg Turkman. He remained in Asadabad for next 2 years until his death.

Personal life 
He had two sons:

 Pirquli Beg - married to Khadija Begum (granddaughter of Jahan Shah)
 Allahquli Beg

References 
Information about Mirza's life is largely found in Tarikh-i-Sultan Muhammad Qutb Shah", a book written for Sultan Muhammad Qutbshah.
1470 deaths
15th-century Iranian people
Government officials of the Kara Koyunlu